Cliff Goldstraw (24 February 1916 – 17 March 1994) was an  Australian rules footballer who played with St Kilda in the Victorian Football League (VFL).

Notes

External links 

1916 births
1994 deaths
Australian rules footballers from Victoria (Australia)
St Kilda Football Club players
Terang Football Club players